Kelton is an unincorporated community in Penn Township in Chester County, Pennsylvania, United States. Kelton is located at the intersection of Pennsylvania Route 796 and Kelton Road.

References

Unincorporated communities in Chester County, Pennsylvania
Unincorporated communities in Pennsylvania